Archibald Lang Livingstone (30 August 1872 – after 1910) was a Scottish professional footballer who played as a wing half in the Football League for Burnley and Burton United. He also played in the Southern League and the Scottish League and later player-managed Peterborough City.

Personal life 
Livingstone was the older brother of international footballer George Livingstone.

Honours 
Burnley

 Football League Second Division: 1897–98

References

1872 births
Footballers from West Dunbartonshire
Scottish footballers
Association football wing halves
Burnley F.C. players
Nelson F.C. players
Burton United F.C. players
Brighton & Hove Albion F.C. players
Norwich City F.C. players
Peterborough & Fletton United F.C. players
English Football League players
Norwich City F.C. non-playing staff
Southern Football League players
Year of death missing